Sha Aimin is currently the President of Chang'an University, China and a professor of highway engineering.

Early life
Sha was born in Xuancheng, Anhui, China in 1964. He completed his Ph.D. in transportation engineering from Kharkiv National Highway Automotive Technology University, Ukraine.

Career
From 2006-2017, Sha was a deputy president of Chang'an University. In 2019, he was appointed president. His research is related to highway engineering and he has published several papers on this subject. He is Vice Chairman of Road Engineering Branch of China Highway Society and a Director of the Academic Committee of the World Transport Congress (WTC).

References

1964 births
Living people
Chinese educators